Women in Somalia form a key part of Somali society, with clearly defined and important roles in the family and  structure. This includes Somali women in Somaliland, a self-declared republic that is internationally recognized as an autonomous region of Somalia. From the time of Ismail Urwayni's proselytizing in 1890, until the Dervish State's defeat by British air bombardment in 1920, women in the strip of land from Jidali, Sanaag in the north, to Beledweyne in the south were referred to as Darawiishaad (plural) or Darwiishad (singular).

Population

Most people in Somalia are Muslims. Somalia's population is expanding at a growth rate of 1.67% per annum and a birth rate of 41.45 births/1,000 people. Somalia's total fertility rate in 2013 was 6.17 children born per woman, the fourth highest in the world.

Most local residents are young, with a median age of 17.7 years. 44.3% of the population are between the ages of 0–14 years, 53.5% are between the ages of 15–64 years, and only 2.3% are 65 years of age or older. The sex ratio is roughly balanced, with proportionally about as many men as women.

Due to the civil war, exact population statistics for Somalia have been difficult to determine since 1975.  According to the United Nations, roughly half the population of Somalia, as of 2014, is female.

When compared to other African countries there are lower levels of education and higher levels of infant mortality in Somalia.

History of women's rights in Somalia 

By the late 9th century A.D., almost all people living in Somalia had converted to Islam. The rights of women under the Quran include the right to life, education, ownership and inheritance of property, as well as the right to give consent to be married and the right to a marriage contract with one's future husband. At the same time, Somali culture has traditionally operated as a patriarchy, where men made the majority of financial and family decisions, and dominated the public sphere.

After Somalia gained its independence from colonial powers in 1960, both men and women were given the right to vote. This led to increased participation of women in public life from the 1970s to the 1980s.  Female school enrollment, women in the workplace, and women's participation in politics and the military all increased during that time. The Family Law of 1975 gave equal rights to women and men regarding marriage, divorce, and inheritance of property and restricted polygamy. President Siad Barre supported the establishment of the Somali Women's Democratic Organization (SWDO) in 1977 in memory of Hawo Tako, a female member of the anti-colonialist Somali Youth League who was killed by the Italian forces in 1948.  The Barre regime established the SWDO and appointed its female leadership in order to maintain female compliance with the government.

Gender equality 
Women in urban areas are more likely to be head of the household.

Clan and family structure

The clan groupings of the Somali people are important social units, and clan membership plays a central part in Somali culture and politics. Clans are patrilineal and are often divided into sub-clans, sometimes with many sub-divisions.

Somali society is traditionally ethnically endogamous. Women who marry are expected to join their husband's family. To extend ties of alliance, marriage is often to another Somali from a different clan. For example, a 1994 study observed that in 89 marriages contracted by men of the Dhulbahante clan, 55 (62%) were with women of Dhulbahante sub-clans other than those of their husbands; 30 (33.7%) were with women of surrounding clans of other clan families (Isaaq, 28; Hawiye, 3); and 3 (4.3%) were with women of other clans of the Darod clan family (Majeerteen 2, Ogaden 1).

In 1975, the most prominent government reforms regarding family law in a Muslim country were set in motion in the Somali Democratic Republic, which put women and men, including husbands and wives, on complete equal footing. The 1975 Somali Family Law gave men and women equal division of property between the husband and wife upon divorce and the exclusive right to control by each spouse over his or her personal property.

Attire

During regular, day-to-day activities, women in Somalia usually wear the guntiino, a long stretch of cloth tied over the shoulder and draped around the waist. The guntiino is traditionally made out of plain white fabric sometimes featuring with decorative borders, although nowadays alindi, a textile common in the Horn of Africa region and some parts of North Africa, is more frequently used. The garment can be worn in many different styles and with different fabrics.

Under the Socialist Barre regime (1969–1991), women were free to dress as they wished, and most urban women did not wear hijab; however, after the outbreak of the Somali Civil War in 1991, most women in Mogadishu started to wear hijab for the first time, and those who did not were harassed.

For more formal settings such as weddings or religious celebrations like Eid, women wear the dirac, a long, light, diaphanous voile dress made of cotton, polyester or saree fabric. Known as the gorgorad, the underskirt is made out of silk and serves as a key part of the overall outfit.

The dirac is usually sparkly and very colorful, the most popular styles being those with gilded borders or threads. The fabric is typically acquired from Somali clothing stores in tandem with the gorgorad. In the past, dirac fabric was also frequently purchased from South Asian merchandisers.

Married women tend to sport head-scarves referred to as shash, and also often cover their upper body with a shawl known as garbasaar. Unmarried or young women do not always cover their heads. Traditional Arabian garb such as the jilbab is also commonly worn.

Additionally, Somali women have a long tradition of wearing gold and silver jewelry, particularly bangles. During weddings, the bride is frequently adorned in gold. Many Somali women by tradition also wear gold necklaces and anklets. Xirsi, a quranic necklace, also worn in countries such as Ethiopia and Yemen, is also frequently worn.

Henna is another important part of Somali culture. It is worn by Somali women on their hands, arms, feet and neck during weddings, Eid, Ramadan, and other festive occasions. Somali henna designs are similar to those in the Arabian peninsula, often featuring flower motifs and triangular shapes. The palm is also frequently decorated with a dot of henna and the fingertips are dipped in the dye. Henna parties are usually held before the wedding ceremony takes place.

Somali girls and women who practice Islam will wear hijab.  This has become the most familiar mode of dress for Somali girls and women.

According to a poll cited by Face2Face Africa, Somalia has the most beautiful women in Africa.

Literature

Somalia has a long tradition of poetry. Several well-developed Somali forms of verse include the female-driven buraanbur, as well as gabay, jiifto, geeraar, wiglo, beercade, afarey and guuraw. The gabay (epic poem) is mostly composed by men has the most complex length and meter, often exceeding 100 lines. It is considered the mark of poetic attainment when a young poet is able to compose such verse, and is regarded as the height of poetry.

Buraanbur, which is of a lighter measure, is primarily composed by women. Groups of memorizers and reciters (hafidayaal) traditionally propagated the well-developed art form. Poems revolve around several main themes, including baroorodiiq (elegy), amaan (praise), jacayl (romance), guhaadin (diatribe), digasho (gloating) and guubaabo (guidance). The baroorodiiq is composed to commemorate the death of a prominent poet or figure.

Notable women

Notable women in the country include Honourable Fawzia Yusuf H. Adam, a Member of Parliament and  Former Deputy Prime Minister and Foreign Minister, currently Chairperson of the National Democratic Party and Chair of HIIGSI  a Collition  of 10 political parties in Somalia. First female Presidential Candidate (Fadumo Dayib), Barnet Muslim Women's Network  a collion Hanan Ibrahim, former Federal Minister of Social Development Maryam Qaasim, former  former Foreign Minister of the Somaliland region Edna Adan Ismail, and parliamentary consultant Hodan Ahmed.

FGM 

About 97.9% of Somalia's women and girls underwent female genital mutilation in a 2005 study. This was at the time the world's highest prevalence rate of the procedure. A UNICEF 2010 report reported that Somalia had the world's highest rate of Type III FGM, with 79% of all Somali women having undergone the procedure. Another 15% of women underwent Type II FGM.

The prevalence is on the decline in the northern part of Somalia. In 2013, UNICEF in conjunction with the Somali authorities reported that the FGM prevalence rate among 1- to 14-year-old girls in the autonomous northern Puntland and Somaliland regions had dropped to 25% following a social and religious awareness campaign. Article 15 of the Federal Constitution adopted in August 2012 prohibits female circumcision.

See also
Polygamy in Somalia
Women in Arab societies
Women in Islam

Notes

References

External links

 
 
Somali culture
Society of Somalia
Gender roles by society
Somalia
Women in Somaliland